A set is the mathematical model for a collection of different things; a set contains elements or members, which can be mathematical objects of any kind: numbers, symbols, points in space, lines, other geometrical shapes, variables, or even other sets.  The set with no element is the empty set; a set with a single element is a singleton.  A set may have a finite number of elements or be an infinite set.  Two sets are equal if they have precisely the same elements.

Sets are ubiquitous in modern mathematics. Indeed, set theory, more specifically Zermelo–Fraenkel set theory, has been the standard way to provide rigorous foundations for all branches of mathematics since the first half of the 20th century.

History

The concept of a set emerged in mathematics at the end of the 19th century. The German word for set, Menge, was coined by Bernard Bolzano in his work Paradoxes of the Infinite. Georg Cantor, one of the founders of set theory,   gave the following definition at the beginning of his Beiträge zur Begründung der transfiniten Mengenlehre:

Bertrand Russell called a set a class:

Naive set theory

The foremost property of a set is that it can have elements, also called members. Two sets are equal when they have the same elements. More precisely, sets A and B are equal if every element of A is an element of B, and every element of B is an element of A; this property is called the extensionality of sets. 

The simple concept of a set has proved enormously useful in mathematics, but paradoxes arise if no restrictions are placed on how sets can be constructed:
 Russell's paradox shows that the "set of all sets that do not contain themselves", i.e., cannot exist.
 Cantor's paradox shows that "the set of all sets" cannot exist.

Naïve set theory defines a set as any well-defined collection of distinct elements, but problems arise from the vagueness of the term well-defined.

Axiomatic set theory
In subsequent efforts to resolve these paradoxes since the time of the original formulation of naïve set theory, the properties of sets have been defined by axioms. Axiomatic set theory takes the concept of a set as a primitive notion. The purpose of the axioms is to provide a basic framework from which to deduce the truth or falsity of particular mathematical propositions (statements) about sets, using first-order logic. According to Gödel's incompleteness theorems however, it is not possible to use first-order logic to prove any such particular axiomatic set theory is free from paradox.

How sets are defined and set notation
A set may also be called a collection or family, especially when its elements are themselves sets.

Roster notation
Roster or enumeration notation defines a set by listing its elements between curly brackets, separated by commas:

In a set, all that matters is whether each element is in it or not, so the ordering of the elements in roster notation is irrelevant (in contrast, in a sequence, a tuple, or a permutation of a set, the ordering of the terms matters). For example,  and  represent the same set.

For sets with many elements, especially those following an implicit pattern, the list of members can be abbreviated using an ellipsis ''. For instance, the set of the first thousand positive integers may be specified in roster notation as

Infinite sets in roster notation
An infinite set is a set with an endless list of elements. To describe an infinite set in roster notation, an ellipsis is placed at the end of the list, or at both ends, to indicate that the list continues forever. For example, the set of nonnegative integers is

and the set of all integers is

Semantic definition
Another way to define a set is to use a rule to determine what the elements are:

Such a definition is called a semantic description.

Set-builder notation

Set-builder notation specifies a set as a selection from a larger set, determined by a condition on the elements. For example, a set  can be defined as follows:

In this notation, the vertical bar "|" means "such that", and the description can be interpreted as " is the set of all numbers  such that  is an integer in the range from 0 to 19 inclusive". Some authors use a colon ":" instead of the vertical bar.

Classifying methods of definition
Philosophy uses specific terms to classify types of definitions:
An intensional definition uses a rule to determine membership. Semantic definitions and definitions using set-builder notation are examples.
An extensional definition describes a set by listing all its elements. Such definitions are also called enumerative.
An ostensive definition is one that describes a set by giving examples of elements; a roster involving an ellipsis would be an example.

Membership

The empty set

The empty set (or null set) is the unique set that has no members.

Singleton sets

A singleton set is a set with exactly one element; such a set may also be called a unit set.
The set  and the element x mean different things; Halmos draws the analogy that a box containing a hat is not the same as the hat.

Subsets

If every element of set A is also in B, then A is described as being a subset of B, or contained in B, written A ⊆ B, or B ⊇ A. The latter notation may be read B contains A, B includes A, or B is a superset of A. The relationship between sets established by ⊆ is called inclusion or containment. Two sets are equal if they contain each other: A ⊆ B and B ⊆ A is equivalent to A = B.

If A is a subset of B, but A is not equal to B, then A is called a proper subset of B. This can be written A ⊊ B. Likewise, B ⊋ A means B is a proper superset of A, i.e. B contains A, and is not equal to A.

A third pair of operators ⊂ and ⊃ are used differently by different authors: some authors use A ⊂ B and B ⊃ A to mean A is any subset of B (and not necessarily a proper subset), while others reserve A ⊂ B and B ⊃ A for cases where A is a proper subset of B.

Examples:
 The set of all humans is a proper subset of the set of all mammals.
  ⊂ .
  ⊆ .

The empty set is a subset of every set, and every set is a subset of itself:
 ∅ ⊆ A.
 A ⊆ A.

Euler and Venn diagrams

An Euler diagram is a graphical representation of a collection of sets; each set is depicted as a planar region enclosed by a loop, with its elements inside. If two sets have no elements in common, the regions do not overlap. 

A Venn diagram, in contrast, is a graphical representation of  sets in which the  loops divide the plane into  zones such that for each way of selecting some of the  sets (possibly all or none), there is a zone for the elements that belong to all the selected sets and none of the others.

Special sets of numbers in mathematics

There are sets of such mathematical importance, to which mathematicians refer so frequently, that they have acquired special names and notational conventions to identify them. 

Many of these important sets are represented in mathematical texts using bold (e.g. ) or blackboard bold (e.g. ) typeface. These include

Each of the above sets of numbers has an infinite number of elements. Each is a subset of the sets listed below it. 

Sets of positive or negative numbers are sometimes denoted by superscript plus and minus signs, respectively. For example,  represents the set of positive rational numbers.

Functions
A function is called
An injective function is called an injection, a surjective function is called a surjection, and a bijective function is called a bijection or one-to-one correspondence.

Cardinality

For example, if , then . Repeated members in roster notation are not counted, so , too.

More formally, two sets share the same cardinality if there exists a one-to-one correspondence between them.

The cardinality of the empty set is zero.

Infinite sets and infinite cardinality
The list of elements of some sets is endless, or infinite. For example, the set  of natural numbers is infinite. In fact, all the special sets of numbers mentioned in the section above are infinite. Infinite sets have infinite cardinality. 

Some infinite cardinalities are greater than others. Arguably one of the most significant results from set theory is that the set of real numbers has greater cardinality than the set of natural numbers.

However, it can be shown that the cardinality of a straight line (i.e., the number of points on a line) is the same as the cardinality of any segment of that line, of the entire plane, and indeed of any finite-dimensional Euclidean space.

The continuum hypothesis

The continuum hypothesis, formulated by Georg Cantor in 1878, is the statement that there is no set with cardinality strictly between the cardinality of the natural numbers and the cardinality of a straight line. In 1963, Paul Cohen proved that the continuum hypothesis is independent of the axiom system ZFC consisting of Zermelo–Fraenkel set theory with the axiom of choice. (ZFC is the most widely-studied version of axiomatic set theory.)

Power sets

If  has  elements, then  has  elements. For example,  has three elements, and its power set has  elements, as shown above.

If  is infinite (whether countable or uncountable), then  is uncountable. (There is never a bijection from  onto .)

Partitions

A partition of a set S is a set of nonempty subsets of S, such that every element x in S is in exactly one of these subsets. That is, the subsets are pairwise disjoint (meaning any two sets of the partition contain no element in common), and the union of all the subsets of the partition is S.

Basic operations 

In set-builder notation, . The complement may also be called the absolute complement to distinguish it from the relative complement below. Example: If the universal set is taken to be the set of integers, then the complement of the set of even integers is the set of odd integers.

 their union  is the set of all things that are members of A or B or both.
 the set difference  (also written ) is the set of all things that belong to  but not .
One has .

Examples:
 }.
 }.
 }.
 }.
 }.

The operations above satisfy many identities.

When one or both are infinite, multiplication of cardinal numbers is defined to make this true.)

The power set of any set becomes a Boolean ring with symmetric difference as the addition of the ring and intersection as the multiplication of the ring.

Applications
Sets are ubiquitous in modern mathematics. For example, structures in abstract algebra, such as groups, fields and rings, are sets closed under one or more operations.

One of the main applications of naive set theory is in the construction of relations. A relation from a domain  to a codomain  is a subset of the Cartesian product . Another example is the set  of all pairs , where  is real.

Principle of inclusion and exclusion

The inclusion–exclusion principle is a technique for counting the elements in a union of two finite sets in terms of the sizes of the two sets and their intersection. It can be expressed symbolically as

A more general form of the principle gives the cardinality of any finite union of finite sets:

See also

 Algebra of sets
 Alternative set theory
 Category of sets
 Class (set theory)
 Dense set
 Family of sets
 Fuzzy set
 Internal set
 Mereology
 Multiset
 Principia Mathematica
 Rough set

Notes

References

External links

Cantor's "Beiträge zur Begründung der transfiniten Mengenlehre" (in German)

Concepts in logic
Mathematical objects